The surname Rubik may refer to:

 Anja Rubik (born 1983), Polish fashion model
 Ernő Rubik (aircraft designer) (1910–1997), Hungarian aircraft designer, father of Ernő Rubik
 Ernő Rubik (born 1944), Hungarian professor and inventor, son of Ernő Rubik (aircraft designer)
 Piotr Rubik (born 1968), Polish composer